And Here Is 'Music for the Fireside' is an 1985 EP by New Zealand indie rock group The Bats.

Flying Nun released the first three Bats EPs as Compiletely Bats.

Critical reception
AllMusic called the EP "another classic, flawless piece of the stunning mid-'80s Flying Nun pop puzzle." Trouser Press wrote that it spans "from lackadaisical laments to sweeping, enticing rushes of pure pop satisfaction, each made all the more appealing by Scott’s nasal, high register vocals."

Track listing

Personnel
Malcolm Grant - drums, percussion
Paul Kean  - backing vocals, bass, guitar (on "Chicken Bird Run")
Robert Scott - vocals, guitar
Kaye Woodward - backing vocals, guitar, bass (on "Chicken Bird Run")

Also credited:
Alastair Galbraith - violin on "Chicken Bird Run", "Blindfold" and "Neighbours".
Arnold Von Bussell - assistant engineer

References

1985 EPs
The Bats (New Zealand band) albums
Flying Nun Records EPs
Dunedin Sound albums